James Manclark (born 3 December 1939) is a British luger. He competed in the men's singles event at the 1968 Winter Olympics.

Manclark worked as a farmer. He discovered luge while on holiday in Switzerland. He later competed in bobsleigh and elephant polo.

References

1939 births
Living people
British male lugers
Olympic lugers of Great Britain
Lugers at the 1968 Winter Olympics
People from Peebles